Poly [ADP-ribose] polymerase 4 is an enzyme that in humans is encoded by the PARP4 gene.

This gene encodes poly(ADP-ribosyl)transferase-like 1 protein, which is capable of catalyzing a poly(ADP-ribosyl)ation reaction. This protein has a catalytic domain which is homologous to that of poly (ADP-ribosyl) transferase, but lacks an N-terminal DNA binding domain which activates the C-terminal catalytic domain of poly (ADP-ribosyl) transferase. Since this protein is not capable of binding DNA directly, its transferase activity may be activated by other factors such as protein-protein interaction mediated by the extensive carboxyl terminus.

Interactions
PARP4 has been shown to interact with Major vault protein.

References

Further reading